The Ivindo River is the most important tributary of the Ogooué River, which flows in Gabon.

Course 
The Ivindo River flows from northeast Gabon to the southwest, eventually emptying into the Ogooué River. It flows through some of the wildest and most attractive rainforest in Africa. The upper stretch of the river is fairly gentle, draining the gentle plateau of eastern Gabon. Below the town of Makokou, the only significant town on the river, it drops off the plateau in a series of spectacular waterfalls and gorges.

Tributaries 
 Djoua, which is also a natural border between Gabon and Congo
 Djadie, also written Zadia, which flows across Mekambo
 Liboumba, whose main tributary is the Lodié River
 Mvoung, which flows across Ovan and main tributary is the Kuye River
 Oua
 Bouinandjé
 Karangoua

Exploration 
The Ivindo below Makokou was first traversed by a whitewater expedition in 1998. This was a group from Jackson Hole, Wyoming, consisting of Chris Guier, Bruce Hayse, Louise Lasley, Marilyn Olsen, Rick Sievers and Howie Wolke. The group encountered four impressive falls: Kongue, Mingouli, Tsengue Leledei, and an unnamed and undescribed falls between Mingouli and Tsengue Leledei which was perhaps the most beautiful of all. There were many stretches of whitewater and the banks were remarkable for groups of unafraid elephants and occasional other mammals.

Trivia 
 The Trans-Gabon Railway has two bridges over the confluence between the Ivindo and the Ogowe Rivers.
 Much of the area around the Ivindo has received National Park status.

See also

Kongou Falls

References 

 National Geographic. 2003. African Adventure Atlas Pg 24,72. led by Sean Fraser
 Lerique Jacques. 1983. Hydrographie-Hydrologie. in Geographie et Cartographie du Gabon, Atlas Illustré led by The Ministère de l'Education Nationale de la Republique Gabonaise. Pg 14-15. Paris, France: Edicef.

 
Rivers of Gabon
Ogooué River